Frank Scott may refer to:

 Frank Scott (footballer) (1876–1937), English professional footballer
 Frank Scott (musician) (1921–1995), American musician and arranger
 Frank Scott (poet and legal scholar) (1899–1985), Canadian poet, intellectual, and constitutional expert
 Frank Scott Jr. (born 1983), American politician from Arkansas
 Frank Albert Scott (1949–2005), boxer and boxing coach
 Frank Austin Scott (1848–1922), president of Rutgers College
 Frank D. Scott (1878–1951), American politician from Michigan
 Frank S. Scott (1883–1912), first enlisted member of the United States armed forces to lose his life in an aircraft accident
 Frank Scott-Walford ( – 1935), English football manager
 Frank Sholl Scott (1886–1952), English rugby union player and medical practitioner
 Frank Stewart Scott (1879–1943), Canadian shoe manufacturer and politician

See also
Francis Scott (disambiguation)
 Scott Frank (born 1960), American screenwriter